Paul Trautmann (born 16 December 1916, date of death unknown) was a German ice hockey player who competed for the German national team at the 1936 Winter Olympics in Garmisch-Partenkirchen. He played club hockey for Berliner Schlittschuhclub.

References

External links
 

1916 births
Year of death missing
German ice hockey right wingers
Ice hockey people from Berlin
Ice hockey players at the 1936 Winter Olympics
Olympic ice hockey players of Germany